Sundsvallsflyg was a small regional airline based in Sundsvall, Sweden. Their own staff worked partly as ground personnel and as cabin crew on the aircraft, which were operated by Braathens Regional. Sundsvallflyg was part of the now dissolved brand Sverigeflyg which incorporated several small domestic airlines. 

In 2016, the Sundsvallsflyg brand was, together with several other domestic airline brands, merged into the new BRA Braathens Regional Airlines.

Destinations
Sundsvallsflyg operated the following destinations as of February 2015:

 Stockholm - Stockholm-Bromma Airport
 Sundsvall - Sundsvall-Härnösand Airport base
 Visby - Visby Airport seasonal

Fleet
The Sundsvallsflyg fleet consisted of the following aircraft as of February 2015:
 1 Saab 2000 (operated by Braathens Regional)

References

External links

Official website

Defunct airlines of Sweden
Airlines disestablished in 2016